The Sack of Rome, then part of the Papal States, followed the capture of the city on 6 May 1527 by the mutinous troops of Charles V, Holy Roman Emperor during the War of the League of Cognac. Despite not being ordered to storm the city, with Charles V intending to only use the threat of military action to make Pope Clement VII come to his terms, a largely unpaid Imperial army formed by 14,000 Germans, many of Lutheran faith, 6,000 Spaniards and some Italian contingents occupied the scarcely defended Rome and began looting, slaying and holding citizens for ransom in excess without any restraint. Clement VII took refuge in Castel Sant'Angelo after the Swiss Guard were annihilated in a delaying rearguard action; he remained there until a ransom was paid to the pillagers. 
Benvenuto Cellini, eyewitness to the events, described the sack in his works. It was not until February 1528 that the spread of a plague and the approach of the League forces under Odet de Foix forced the army to withdraw towards Naples from the city. Rome's population had dropped from 55,000 to 10,000 due to the atrocities, famine, an outbreak of plague and flight from the city. The subsequent loss of the League army during the Siege of Naples secured a victory in the War of the League of Cognac for Charles V. The Emperor denied responsibility for the sack and was eventually absolved by Clement VII for the event. On the other hand, the Sack of Rome further exacerbated religious hatred and antagonism between Catholics and Lutherans.

Preceding events

The growing power of Holy Roman Emperor Charles V alarmed Pope Clement VII, who perceived Charles as attempting to dominate the Catholic Church and Italy. Clement VII formed an alliance with Charles V's arch-enemy, King Francis I of France, which came to be known as the League of Cognac, to resist the Habsburg dynasty in Italy.

The army of the Holy Roman Emperor defeated the French army in Italy, but funds were not available to pay the soldiers. The 34,000 Imperial troops mutinied and forced their commander, Charles III, Duke of Bourbon, to lead them towards Rome, which was an easy target for pillaging, due to the unstable political landscape at the time.

Aside from some 6,000 Spaniards under Duke Charles, the army included some 14,000 Landsknechte under Georg von Frundsberg; some Italian infantry led by Fabrizio Maramaldo; the powerful Italian cardinal Pompeo Colonna and Luigi Gonzaga; and some cavalry under the command of Ferdinando Gonzaga and Philibert, Prince of Orange. Though Martin Luther himself was against attacking Rome and Pope Clement VII, some who considered themselves followers of Luther's Protestant movement viewed the papal capital as a target for religious reasons. Numerous bandits, along with the League's deserters, joined the army during its march.

Duke Charles left Arezzo on 20 April 1527, taking advantage of chaos among the Venetians and their allies after a revolt broke out in Florence against Pope Clement VII's family, the Medici. His largely undisciplined troops sacked Acquapendente and San Lorenzo alle Grotte, and then occupied Viterbo and Ronciglione, reaching the walls of Rome on 5 May.

Sack

The imperial troops were 14,000 Germans, 6,000 Spanish, and an uncertain number of Italian infantry.
The troops defending Rome were not at all numerous, consisting of 5,000 militiamen led by Renzo da Ceri and 189 papal Swiss Guard. The city's fortifications included the massive walls, and it possessed a good artillery force, which the imperial army lacked. Duke Charles needed to conquer the city swiftly to avoid the risk of being trapped between the besieged city and the League's army.

On 6 May, the imperial army attacked the walls at the Gianicolo and Vatican Hills. Duke Charles was fatally wounded in the assault, allegedly shot by Benvenuto Cellini. The Duke was wearing his famous white cloak to mark him out to his troops, but it also had the unintended consequence of pointing him out as the leader to his enemies. The death of the last respected commander of authority among the Imperial army caused any restraint in the soldiers to disappear, and they easily captured the walls of Rome the same day. Philibert of Châlon took command of the armies, but he was not as popular or feared, leaving him with little authority.
 

In the event known as the Stand of the Swiss Guard, the Swiss, alongside the garrison's remnant, made their last stand in the Teutonic Cemetery within the Vatican. Their captain, Kaspar Röist, was wounded and later sought refuge in his house, where he was killed by Spanish soldiers in front of his wife. The Swiss fought bitterly, but were hopelessly outnumbered and almost annihilated. Some survivors, accompanied by a band of refugees, fell back to the Basilica steps. Those who went toward the Basilica were massacred, and only 42 survived. This group of 42, under the command of Hercules Goldli, managed to stave off the Habsburg troops pursuing the Pope's entourage as it made its way across the Passetto di Borgo, which was a secure elevated passage that connects the Vatican City to Castel Sant'Angelo.

After the execution of some 1,000 defenders of the papal capital and shrines, the pillage began. Churches and monasteries, as well as the palaces of prelates and cardinals, were looted and destroyed. Even pro-imperial cardinals had to pay to save their properties from the rampaging soldiers. On 8 May, Cardinal Pompeo Colonna, a personal enemy of Clement VII, entered the city. He was followed by peasants from his fiefs, who had come to avenge the sacks they had suffered at the hands of the papal armies. Colonna was touched by the pitiful conditions in the city and gave refuge to some Roman citizens in his palace.

The Vatican Library was saved because Philibert had set up his headquarters there. After three days of ravages, Philibert ordered the sack to cease, but few obeyed. In the meantime, Clement remained a prisoner in Castel Sant'Angelo. Francesco Maria della Rovere and Michele Antonio of Saluzzo arrived with troops on 1 June in Monterosi, north of the city. Their cautious behaviour prevented them from obtaining an easy victory against the now totally undisciplined imperial troops. On 6 June, Clement VII surrendered, and agreed to pay a ransom of 400,000 ducati in exchange for his life; conditions included the cession of Parma, Piacenza, Civitavecchia and Modena to the Holy Roman Empire (however, only the last would change hands). At the same time Venice took advantage of this situation to capture Cervia and Ravenna, while Sigismondo Malatesta returned to Rimini.

Aftermath and effects

Often cited as the end of the Italian High Renaissance, the Sack of Rome impacted the histories of Europe, Italy, and Christianity, creating lasting ripple effects throughout European culture and politics.

Before the Sack, Pope Clement VII opposed the ambitions of Emperor Charles V and the Spanish, who he believed wished to dominate Italy and the Church. Afterward, he no longer had the military or financial resources to do so. To avert more warfare, Clement adopted a conciliatory policy toward Charles. Charles then began exerting more control over the Church and Italy.

The Sack had major repercussions for Italian society and culture, and in particular, for Rome. Clement's War of the League of Cognac would be the last fight for Italian independence until the nineteenth century. Rome, which had been a center of Italian High Renaissance culture and patronage before the Sack, suffered depopulation and economic collapse, causing artists and thinkers to scatter. The city's population dropped from over 55,000 before the attack to 10,000 afterward. An estimated 6,000 to 12,000 people were murdered. Among those who died from the sack was the papal secretary Paolo Valdabarini and the professor of Natural History Augusto Valdo.

Many Imperial soldiers also died in the aftermath, largely from diseases caused by masses of unburied corpses in the streets.  Pillaging finally ended in February 1528, eight months after the initial attack, when the city's food supply ran out, there was no one left to ransom, and plague appeared. Clement would continue artistic patronage and building projects in Rome, but a perceived Medicean golden age had passed. The city did not recover its population losses until approximately 1560.

A power shift – away from the Pope, toward the Emperor – also produced lasting consequences for Catholicism.  After learning of the Sack, Emperor Charles professed great embarrassment that his troops had imprisoned Pope Clement; however, he had ordered troops to Italy to bring Clement under his control, albeit he wanted to avoid destruction within the city of Rome, which damaged his reputation. Charles eventually came to terms with the Pope with the treaty of Barcelona and the coronation of Bologna. This done, Charles molded the Church in his own image. Clement, never again to directly oppose the Emperor, rubber-stamped Charles' demands – among them naming cardinals nominated by the latter; crowning Charles Holy Roman Emperor at Bologna in 1530  and refusing to annul the marriage of Charles' beloved aunt, Catherine of Aragon, to King Henry VIII of England, prompting the English Reformation. Cumulatively, these actions changed the complexion of the Catholic Church, steering it away from Renaissance freethought personified by the Medici Popes, toward the religious orthodoxy exemplified by the Counterreformation. After Clement's death in 1534, under the influence of Charles and later his son King Philip II of Spain (1556–1598), the Inquisition became pervasive, and the humanism encouraged by Renaissance culture came to be viewed as contrary to the teachings of the Church.

The Sack also contributed to making permanent the split between Catholics and Protestants.  Before the Sack, Charles and Clement disagreed over how to address Martin Luther and the Protestant Reformation, which was spreading throughout Germany. Charles advocated for calling a Church Council to settle the matter. Clement opposed this, believing that monarchs shouldn't dictate Church policy; and also fearing a revival of conciliarism, which had exacerbated the Western Schism during the 14th–15th centuries, and deposed numerous Popes. Clement advocated for fighting a Holy War to unite Christendom. Charles opposed this because his armies and treasury were occupied in fighting other wars.  After the Sack, Clement acceded to Charles' wishes, agreeing to call a Church Council and naming the city of Trent, Italy as its site.  He did not convene the Council of Trent during his lifetime, fearing that the event would be a dangerous powerplay, and perhaps even a death-trap. In 1545, eleven years after Clement's death, his successor Pope Paul III convened the Council of Trent. As Charles predicted, it reformed the corruption present in certain orders of the Catholic Church. However, by 1545, the moment for reconciliation between Catholics and Protestants – arguably a possibility during the 1520s, given cooperation between the Pope and Emperor – had passed.  In assessing the effects of the Sack of Rome, Martin Luther commented: "Christ reigns in such a way that the Emperor who persecutes Luther for the Pope is forced to destroy the Pope for Luther" (LW 49:169).

In commemoration of the Swiss Guard's bravery in defending Pope Clement VII during the Sack of Rome, recruits to the Swiss Guard are sworn in on 6 May every year.

Notes

References

Bibliography
 Buonaparte, Jacopo (1830). Sac de Rome, écrit en 1527 par Jacques Bonaparte, témion oculaire: traduction de l'italien par N. L. B. (Napoléon-Louis Bonaparte). Florence: Imprimerie granducale.

 Arborio di Gattinara, Mercurino (Marchese) (1866). Il sacco di Roma nel 1527: relazione. Ginevra: G.-G. Fick.
 Carlo Milanesi, ed. (1867). Il Sacco di Roma del MDXXVII: narrazione di contemporanei (in Italian). Firenze: G. Barbèra.
 Schulz, Hans (1894). Der Sacco di Roma: Karls V. Truppen in Rom, 1527–1528. Hallesche Abhandlungen zur neueren Geschichte (in German). Heft 32. Halle: Max Niemeyer.
 Lenzi, Maria Ludovica (1978). Il sacco di Roma del 1527. Firenze: La nuova Italia.
 Chamberlin, E. R. (1979). The Sack of Rome. New York: Dorset.
 
 Pitts, Vincent Joseph (1993). The man who sacked Rome: Charles de Bourbon, constable of France (1490–1527). American university studies / 9, Series 9, History, Vol. 142. New York: P. Lang. .
 Gouwens, Kenneth (1998). Remembering the Renaissance: Humanist Narratives of the Sack of Rome. Leiden-New York: Brill .
 Gouwens, Kenneth; Reiss, Sheryl E. (2005). The Pontificate of Clement VII: History, Politics, Culture ((collected papers) ed.). Aldershot (UK); Burlington (Vermont): Ashgate. .

External links

 Pope's guards celebrate 500 years, BBC News Online; dated and retrieved 22 January 2006
 Vatican's honour to Swiss Guards, BBC News Online; dated and retrieved 6 May 2006

1527 in Italy
Conflicts in 1527
Renaissance
Swiss Guard
Sieges of the Italian Wars
Sieges involving the Papal States
Sieges involving the Holy Roman Empire
Sieges involving Spain
Rome 1527
Renaissance Rome
1527 in the Papal States
16th century in Rome
16th century in Italy
Military history of Rome
Last stands
Spanish Army
Looting
Wikipedia articles containing unlinked shortened footnotes